Tyrant is a comic book series published by Spiderbaby Grafix about a Tyrannosaurus rex, written by Steve Bissette.

Publication history
There were four issues published in the mid 90s.

A new Tyrant page appeared in Sundays and Bissette has discussed a proposal he prepared involving a Tyrant revival.

Plot
The comic book series focuses on a t-rex's struggles to survive, from even before it emerges from the shell.

Awards
 1995: Nominated for "Best New Series" Eisner Award.

Notes

References

Dinosaurs in comic books